Till fjälls ("To the Mountains") is the first full-length album by Swedish folk metal band Vintersorg.  Stylistically this continued in the same musical vein as the previous album, Hedniskhjärtad, with black metal-style riffs, harsh vocals and blast beats interspersed with folk melodies, acoustics, and atmospherics.

Track listing

Personnel
 Vintersorg - vocals, guitars, bass, keyboards

Additional personnel and staff
 Vargher - keyboards, drum programming
 Nils Johansson - keyboards
 Andreas Frank - lead guitar on "För kung och fosterland" and "Asatider"
 Cia Hedmark - female vocals on "Isjungfrun" and "Fångad utav nordens själ"

References

Vintersorg albums
1998 debut albums
Napalm Records albums